The Encyclopedia of China Publishing House is a publishing company in China.  It was established in Beijing on November 18, 1978.

The Publishing House has published the Encyclopedia of China (中国大百科全书) and the Chinese version of the Encyclopædia Britannica.

See also
 Publishing industry in China

References

External links
Official Website 

Book publishing companies of China
Publishing companies established in 1978
Mass media in Beijing